Jefferson County is a county located in the U.S. state of Mississippi; its western border is formed by the Mississippi River. As of the 2020 census, the population was 7,260, making it the fourth-least populous county in Mississippi. Its county seat is Fayette. The county is named for U.S. President Thomas Jefferson.

Originally developed as cotton plantations in the antebellum era, the rural county has struggled with a declining economy and reduced population since the mechanization of agriculture and urbanization of other areas. In 2020, its population of 7,260 was roughly one-third of the population peak in 1900. Within the United States, in 2009 rural Jefferson County had the highest percentage of African-Americans of any county. It was the fourth-poorest county in the nation.

Geography

Major highways
  U.S. Highway 61
  Mississippi Highway 28
  Mississippi Highway 33

Adjacent counties
 Claiborne County (north)
 Copiah County (northeast)
 Lincoln County (southeast)
 Franklin County (south)
 Adams County (southwest)
 Tensas Parish, Louisiana (west)

National protected areas
 Homochitto National Forest (part)
 Natchez Trace Parkway (part)

Demographics

2020 census

As of the 2020 United States Census, there were 7,260 people, 2,448 households, and 1,488 families residing in the county.

2010 census
As of the 2010 United States Census, there were 7,726 people living in the county. 85.7% were Black or African American, 13.7% White, 0.2% Native American and 0.3% of two or more races. 0.4% were Hispanic or Latino (of any race).

2000 census
As of the census of 2000, there were 9,740 people, 3,308 households, and 2,338 families living in the county. The population density was 19 people per square mile (7/km2). There were 3,819 housing units at an average density of 7 per square mile (3/km2). The racial makeup of the county was 13.06% White, 86.49% Black or African American, 0.08% Native American, 0.10% Asian, 0.01% Pacific Islander, 0.02% from other races, and 0.24% from two or more races. 0.66% of the population were Hispanic or Latino of any race. Jefferson County has the highest percentage of black residents of any U.S. county.

There were 3,308 households, out of which 36.60% had children under the age of 18 living with them, 36.00% were married couples living together, 28.50% had a female householder with no husband present, and 29.30% were non-families. 27.10% of all households were made up of individuals, and 10.10% had someone living alone who was 65 years of age or older. The average household size was 2.75 and the average family size was 3.36.

In the county, the population was much younger than the national average with 28.80% under the age of 18, 12.10% from 18 to 24, 28.50% from 25 to 44, 19.60% from 45 to 64, and 10.90% who were 65 years of age or older. The median age was 32 years. For every 100 females there were 99.00 males. For every 100 females age 18 and over, there were 99.00 males.

The median income for a household in the county was $18,447, and the median income for a family was $23,188. Males had a median income of $25,726 versus $18,000 for females. The per capita income for the county was $9,709. About 32.50% of families and 36.00% of the population were below the poverty line, including 46.00% of those under age 18 and 34.40% of those age 65 or over.

In 2009, Jefferson County had the lowest per capita income in Mississippi and the 17th lowest in the United States.

Education
Jefferson County School District operates public schools in all of the county.

Communities

City
 Fayette (county seat)

Unincorporated communities
 Cannonsburg
 Church Hill
 Coon Box
 Harriston
 Lorman
 McBride
 Red Lick
 Union Church

Ghost towns or defunct
 Ashland (or Ashland Landing)
 Gum Ridge
 Old Greenville
 Rodney
 Uniontown

Politics
Jefferson County is overwhelmingly Democratic, and has supported Democratic candidates in presidential elections with at least 80% of the vote since Bill Clinton in 1992, who won 79%. Republicans have not garnered even 25% of the vote in presidential elections since 1972 (when Jefferson was one of only three counties in Mississippi to vote for George McGovern).

The last Republican to win the county was Barry Goldwater. Although Goldwater lost nationally in a landslide, he carried the state of Mississippi (and also Jefferson County) in a landslide, winning over 87% of the vote and carrying every county. Jefferson County supported him with 95% of the vote. Goldwater's lopsided victory was the result of Mississippi's decades-long suppression of the voting rights of African Americans, which only began to be reversed with the passage of the Voting Rights Act of 1965.

Notable people
 Abijah Hunt, merchant who lived in Old Greenville during the Territorial Period, and owned a chain of stores and public cotton gins along the Natchez Trace
 David Hunt, Antebellum planter who lived on Woodlawn Plantation in Jefferson County, and became one of 12 planter millionaires in the Natchez District before the American Civil War.
 Zachary Taylor, U.S. president, planter, and soldier who often stayed on his plantation, Cypress Grove in Jefferson County, between 1840 and 1848.

See also

 Cypress Grove Plantation
 National Register of Historic Places listings in Jefferson County, Mississippi
 Prospect Hill Plantation
 Springfield Plantation (Fayette, Mississippi)
 Woodland Plantation (Church Hill, Mississippi)
 Wyolah Plantation

References

 
Mississippi counties
Populated places established in 1799
Mississippi counties on the Mississippi River
1799 establishments in Mississippi Territory
Black Belt (U.S. region)
Majority-minority counties in Mississippi